is an Aten near-Earth asteroid less than 20 meters in diameter crudely estimated to have passed roughly 6500 km above the surface of Earth on 31 March 2004.

It was only observed for 44 minutes on 31 March 2004, by the Lincoln Near-Earth Asteroid Research (LINEAR) team at Lincoln Laboratory's Experimental Test Site in Socorro, New Mexico, and remains a lost asteroid. The estimated 4 to 6 meter sized body made one of the closest known approaches to Earth.

Description 
On 31 March 2004, around 15:35 UTC, the asteroid is crudely estimated to have passed within approximately 1 Earth radius or 6,400 kilometers of the surface of the Earth (or 2.02  from Earth's center). But due to the very short observation arc, the uncertainty in the close approach distance is a large ±15000 km. By comparison, geostationary satellites orbit at 5.6  and GPS satellites orbit at 3.17  from the center of the Earth.

 this was the third or fourth closest approach.

It was only observed four times in the space of 44 minutes and could not be followed up. Nevertheless, "the orbit is quite determinate and, given the exceptional nature of this close approach, the object is now receiving a designation". No precovery images have been found.

 is estimated to be approximately 6 meters in diameter.  This means that it would burn up from atmospheric friction before striking the ground in the case of an Earth impact.

On 26 March 2010, it may have come within 0.0825 AU (12.3 million km) of Earth, but with an uncertainty parameter of 9, the orbit is poorly determined.

A closer non-impacting approach to Earth was not known until  on 9 October 2008.

See also

Notes

References

External links 
 MPEC 2004-Q22 (2004 Aug. 22)
 

Minor planet object articles (unnumbered)
20040331
20040331